Earl James "Joaquin" Murphey (often spelled "Murphy", 30 December 1923 in Hollywood, California – 25 October 1999) was an American lap steel guitarist. Nicknamed "Joaquin" by bandleader Spade Cooley to refer to the San Joaquin Valley, Murphey was the cutting edge lap steel guitarist of his time due to his clean legato playing and "innovative" chordal style. He was discovered by Cooley in 1943 and was a member of Cooley's organization on and off for the next decade.  He also worked with Tex Williams and the Western Caravan, a band formed in 1946 by Cooley's former vocalist and a number of his musicians.  Murphey also recorded with the western band Andy Parker and the Plainsmen. Music historian Andy Volk described Murphey as "a jazz musician disguised as a cowboy".

He had a long-lasting friendship with inventor and guitar hardware manufacturer Paul Bigsby, who custom-built
at least three lap-steels for him (a standard, a double neck and even a three neck model).

Murphey also recorded with various West Coast western swing and honky-tonk acts (Jimmie Widener, Johnny Bond, Smokey Rogers and many more) but seldom recorded on his behalf.

In 1980, he was inducted into the Steel Guitar Hall of Fame

His contemporaries included Herb Remington, Leon McAuliffe, Noel Boggs and Speedy West.

Many illustrious steel guitarists such as West and Buddy Emmons claimed Murphey as their main influence and mentor.

 1947 steel guitar custom-built by Paul Bigsby

References 

 The Story of Paul A. Bigsby: Father of the Modern Electric Solid Body Guitar

External links 
 obituary in The Independent
 www.well.com/~wellvis/joaquin.html
 www.johnmcgann.com/joaquin.html
 Steel Guitar Hall of Fame
 Joaquin Murphey, steel guitar, Prt 1 Murph cd
 Joaquin Murphey, steel guitar, Prt 2 Murph cd

1923 births
1999 deaths
20th-century American guitarists
Guitarists from California
American male guitarists
20th-century American male musicians